Liturgical lace refers to the use of lace as a form a liturgical ornamentation at the crossroads of religious art and decorative arts. Based on Ephesians 5 and the visions of the supper of the lamb in the book of Revelation, liturgical lace has been described as a way for the Church to symbolize itself as a virginal bride celebrating the divine marriage with the heavenly spouse. Liturgical lace has also been compared to the fishings nets of the apostles, especially as the Venetian lace is said to have originated from the Venetian sailors' art of knitting nets.

While styles of liturgical lace have evolved through centuries, the most popular trimmings today are considered to be:

 Nottingham Lace, which was invented in 1846 through the use of lace machines
 Leavers Lace, which uses similar machines but come closest to resembling handmade lace
 French Re-embroidered Lace, which is hybrid, using lace machines and adding floral motifs in the lace have been traced in embroidery, enhancing the beauty of the design and lending the lace more weight and structure
 Cantù Lace, which is a handmade bobbin lace dating back to at least the 15th century, which consists of wining vines flowing through each piece of lace on which are added inserts or ‘cartouches’ made of needle lace

History 
The Egyptian origin of liturgical lace

The first trace of the use of lace in a liturgical context was found in the Egyptian sarcophagus.  

The apostolic symbolism: for fishing nets to filet lace

1

The Benedictine tradition of lace

The Franciscan missionary lace

The Venetian renaissance of liturgical lace under the protection of Saint Francis Regis 
Lace industries , which sprang up like mushrooms all over Europe during the sixteenth century , encouraged the addition of lace to embellish the Catholic liturgy.

By the 1660s, Venetian needle lace became the most fashionable lace, with the patronage of the Catholic Church. Its characteristics with the exaggeration of three-dimensional qualities of needle lace; creating patterns which could be divided into parts allowed for the production of large-scale ecclesiastical items like vestments and church furnishings that were "conspicuously extravagant."

However, the major revolution to liturgical lace was sparked off by the invention of mention lace which originated in Nottingham in England, early in the nineteenth century. Lace machines faced the opposition of the Luddites who had to be stopped in their vandalism by the Destruction of Stocking Frames, etc. Act of 1812. Eventually, the machines made lace much more accessible and in the 1840s, lace prices to fall dramatically, which meant that albs, rochets and surplices could be garnished with very high lace of 60 cm. or more.

Through centuries, liturgical lace developed a style of its own across various cultures and even helped grow the industry, as in places such as Poland where bobbin laces were created for liturgical vestments and workshops bloomed across the country.

Liturgical lace under fire since the Church Discipline Act of 1840 
In England, after the Church Discipline Act of 1840 which aimed to counter rise of ritualism in the Anglican Church, Robert Liddell, then vicar of Saint Paul's Church in Knightsbridge, was taken to court by his churchwarden for the use of cloths edged with lace as well as altar crosses and  credence tables. In 1854, while the courts refused him the use of an altar cross and of a credence table, lace was tolerated.

By the mid-19th century in France, lace was considered something of the  18th century and was replaced by more affordable filet lace or tulle which originated in Tulle, a city in the southern central region of France which was criticized as liturgical vestments were meant to be in linen and not in cotton which was used to make the latter.

Meanwhile, lace flourished in Ireland. 

Yet, the trend for more elaborate liturgical lace concerned some in the Catholic Church as well, already in 1880, Pio Martinucci as secretary of the Sacred Congregation for the Discipline of the Sacraments or Ceremonials, noted that the surplice has become merely an ornament whose excess elegance little becomes its sacred usage.

In 1912, the Benedictine monk dom Lambert Beaudoin recommended the use of lace and advised that the best liturgical lace was the one that was sown directly on the liturgical vestment.

From the 1930s onwards, the Liturgical movement was particularly critical of the use of liturgical lace. Women involved in embroidery and sowing at the time criticized liturgical lace as "worldly", "effeminate", and "feminine", arguing it had "no rightful place in the embroidering of liturgical vestments".

In the 1950s, as the trend was to give "imitate the nature of things, truth and substance", the tendency was to reject  the transparency of lace as a frivolous. The price of lace compared to linen was also used as an economic argument against its use in liturgy.

The whole movement was not against lace, as others encouraged its use in order for women to veil themselves when in church in an attempt to return to the earliest centuries of Christian liturgy.

At the Second Vatican Council, liturgical lace was still very much in use.

Between renewal and criticism 

While the Second Vatican Council encouraged the beauty of the celebration, contradictory esthetic standards have led to conflicting positions on the use of lace in liturgy. In the United States alone for example, in 1996, altar lace was recommended as a way to lead toward prayers especially for catechumenate team formation. At the same time, other official documents suggests that the use of altar lace and "old frontals" should be rejected preferring "a simple white cloth without lots of lace or frill".

In the wake of the pedophilia crisis, some went as far as to accuse liturgical lace of feminizing the celibate priesthood by "appropriating a female persona" and enacting "homoerotic aspects".

Since the 1990s, younger generations have been keen on restoring the use of liturgical lace despite being considered as "retro" backwardism by those who presumed it was a return to the past. Under the pontificate of Pope Benedict XVI, the use of liturgical lace made a major comeback. However, Pope Francis has expressed a rather mitigated opinion saying ironically that liturgical lace or merletti described by La Croix journalist as "retrograde accouterments" were merely a "tribute to grandmothers" and needed some aggiornamento sixty years after the Council.

Use: albs, surplices, rochets, mantillas, lace cuffs and framed prayers 

Liturgical lace has been used especially for liturgical vestments suchs as albs, surplices, and rochets or gremiale.

Lace is also often added to liturgical tablecloth and pieces such as chalice covers. Altar lace which consists lace fringe which is usually attached to the front of the altar, was never mentioned in the rubrics, but it become popular in both Catholic and Reformed churches. Thus, even in Lutheran churches of Denmark, altars of most churches use to have "richly embroidered altar frontals, usually in crimson velvet, and with a deep superfrontal of lace". However, the corporal  was never decorated with liturgical lace in order to avoid fragments of the consecrated host from being trapped in their stitching.

Liturgical lace was also used for mantillas, liturgical veil worn by women popular in Spain as well as in Latin America.

Papal nobility would also wear facciole or lace collar, consisting of two separate rectangular strips of lace or muslin, lace cuffs, steel buttons and buckles.

Finally, lace filet is sometimes used to frame Christian prayers such as the Our Father.

Styles 
Liturgical lace uses two main styles of lace: the needlepoint and the bobbin-point lace, which evolved in different geographical contexts but serve similar liturgical settings.

Culture 
The symbolist Flemish poet Georges Rodenbach fantasized about the liturgical lace of the Beguines which he referred to as the "lace of temptation" ("la dentelle de la Tentation").

References

Sources 

 

Roman Catholic vestments
Catholic religious clothing
Lace